Kourouma Fatoukouma (born 7 November 1986) is a former professional footballer who played as a left-back. Born in France, he represented the Niger national team at international level.

Club career
Fatoukouma joined FC Jazz of the Finnish third-tier Kakkonen in April 2019 after a three-year spell with Musan Salama, another Pori based side.

Career statistics
Scores and results list Niger's goal tally first, score column indicates score after each Fatoukouma goal.

References

External links 
 
 

1984 births
Living people
Footballers from Saint-Étienne
People with acquired Nigerien citizenship
French people of Nigerien descent
Nigerien footballers
French footballers
Association football fullbacks
Niger international footballers
Ligue 1 players
AS Saint-Étienne players
Chabab Rif Al Hoceima players
Musan Salama players
FC Jazz players
2013 Africa Cup of Nations players
Nigerien expatriate footballers
French expatriate footballers
French expatriate sportspeople in Morocco
Expatriate footballers in Morocco
Nigerien expatriate sportspeople in Finland
French expatriate sportspeople in Finland
Expatriate footballers in Finland